Agonopterix sapporensis is a moth in the family Depressariidae. It was described by Shōnen Matsumura in 1931. It is found on the Japanese island of Hokkaido and the Russian Far East.

References

Moths described in 1931
Agonopterix
Moths of Japan
Moths of Asia